Ousmane Camara (born 6 March 2003) is a French professional footballer who plays as a midfielder for  club Angers.

Career
Camara made his professional debut with Paris FC in a 3–0 Ligue 2 win over Chambly on 22 August 2020. On 5 November 2020, Camara signed his first professional contract with Paris FC, until June 2023.

On 16 August 2022, Camara signed a four-year contract with Angers.

International career
Born in France, Camara is of Guinean descent. He is a youth international for France, having played for the France U19s.

References

External links
 
 UNFP Profile
 FFF Profile

2003 births
Living people
Footballers from Paris
French footballers
France youth international footballers
French sportspeople of Guinean descent
Association football midfielders
Paris FC players
Angers SCO players
Ligue 2 players
Black French sportspeople